Vicenta González (born 1948 or 1949) is a Nicaraguan humanitarian, the founder of Asociación Mujeres Emprendedoras de las Comunidades de Upala (English: The Association of Women Entrepreneurs of the Communities of Upala), and a retired midwife. She was the Americas winner of the Nansen Refugee Award in 2022.

Early life 
González was born in Nicaragua and has four siblings; her parents were farm workers.

Adult life and career 
González married a man from Costa Rica and in 1967, at the age of 19, moved with him to Costa Rica, where they purchased a farm near Upala.  González worked as a midwife from the farm.

González is the founder of Asociación Mujeres Emprendedoras de las Comunidades de Upala a Costa Rican organisation that supports women who have fled domestic and sexual abuse. She was the Americas finalist of the Nansen Refugee Award in 2022.

Personal life 
González was 74 years old in 2022 and lived in San José District, Upala. She is a mother to two children, and a great grandmother.

References

External links 

 Former Midwife Delivers Safety and Hope to Nicaraguan Refugee Women, United Nations High Commissioner for Refugees, 2022
 AMECUP-Asociación Mujeres Emprendedoras de las Comunidades de Upala, Facebook page.

Midwives
Living people
1940s births
Nicaraguan emigrants to Costa Rica
Women founders
People from San José, Costa Rica